The Apple II line of computers supported a number of Apple II peripheral cards. In an era before plug and play USB or Bluetooth connections, these were expansion cards that plugged into slots on the motherboard. They added to and extended the functionality of the base motherboard when paired with specialized software that enabled the computer to read the input/output of the devices on the other side of the cable (the peripheral) or to take advantage of chips on the board - as was the case with memory expansion cards.

All Apple II models except the Apple IIc had at least seven 50-pin expansion slots, labeled Slots 1 though 7. These slots could hold printed circuit board cards with double-sided edge connectors, 25 "fingers" on each side, with 100 mil (0.1 inch) spacing between centers. Slot 3 in an Apple IIe that has an 80-column card fitted (which is usually the case) and Slots 1 through 6 in a normally configured Apple IIgs are "virtually" filled with on-board devices which means that the physical slots cannot be used at all, or only with certain specific cards, unless the conflicting "virtual" device is disabled.

In addition to the seven standard expansion slots, the following computers contained additional, largely special-purpose expansion slots:

 Apple II and Apple II Plus: Slot 0 (50-pin, for the firmware card or the 16 kB Apple II Language Card)
 Apple IIe: Auxiliary Slot (60-pin; primarily for 80-column display and memory expansion)
 Apple IIgs: Memory Expansion Slot (40-pin)

Perhaps the most common cards found on early Apple II systems were the Disk II Controller Card, which allowed users of earlier Apple IIs to use the Apple Disk II, a 5¼ inch, 140 kB floppy disk drive; and the Apple 16K Language Card, which increased the base memory of late-model Apple II and standard Apple II Plus units from 48 kB to 64 kB. The Z-80 SoftCard, making the computer compatible with CP/M software, was also very popular.

Both Apple and dozens of third-party vendors created hundreds of cards for the Apple II series of computers.  These additional slots afforded great opportunities for expansion.  In the 2000s, long after the last Apple IIe came off Apple's assembly line in 1993, a handful of manufacturers continue to market peripherals and expansion cards for Apple II computers, not counting students, hobbyists, and other Apple II users who continue to push the original machine to its limits.

Categories 

Apple II cards can be broadly divided into the following categories:

50-pin standard slots 
 Serial cards (RS-232 serial interface)
 Parallel cards (Centronics/IEEE 1284 parallel interface)
 Multifunction I/O cards
 Internal modems
 80 column (or more) text cards (e.g., Videx)
 PAL color graphics cards (required for color graphics in early European Apples)
 RGB cards
 Floppy disk controllers
 Hard disk controllers
 Network adapters
 Co-processor cards
 Memory expansion cards
 Accelerators
 Realtime clock cards
 Music and sound cards
 Miscellaneous cards

Other slot types 
 Slot 0 card (Firmware Card, Language Card)
 Apple IIc internal expansion cards
 Apple IIgs memory expansion cards (40-pin IIgs slot type)
 Apple IIgs accelerators
 Apple IIe auxiliary cards (60-pin auxiliary slot; 80-column cards, RGB, memory expansion)

External links

About cards 
   Datasheets, manuals, ROM and disk images, schematics, sound files, photos, and product advertisements related to Apple II computers and peripherals.

Manufacturers 
 ReactiveMicro.com — Hard drive controllers, GS-RAM card, Mockingboard clone, replacement power supplies, No-Slot Clock, MicroDrive, TransWarp GS 32KB Cache Board, other TransWarp GS upgrades
 R & D Automation — CFFA Compact Flash, IDE interface card
 A2 Retrosystems — Uther Ethernet card
 SVD — Semi Virtual Diskette, solid-state 5¼" disk emulator
 8 Bit Baby — prototyping board
 RC Systems — DoubleTalk (Echo and Slotbuster compatible) speech synthesizer card

 
Peripheral cards
Motherboard expansion slot